Vakilabad (also Romanized as Vakīlābād) is a village in Dashtab Rural District, in the Central District of Baft County, Kerman Province, Iran. At the 2006 census, its population was 417, in 100 families.

References 

Populated places in Baft County